Burner Mountain is a summit in West Virginia, in the United States.

Burner Mountain most likely was named after Abraham Burner, a local pioneer settler. The Camp Bartow Historic District, and celebrated inn "Travellers' Repose", are at the foot of the mountain.

References

Monongahela National Forest
Mountains of Pocahontas County, West Virginia
Mountains of West Virginia